Walīd ibn ʿUtba (died 624) was the son of Utba ibn Rabi'a and brother of Abu Hudhayfa ibn Utba and Hind bint Utba. Just like his father, Walid was opposed to Muhammad and Islam.

He was a fierce Meccan warrior who was killed by Ali ibn Abi Talib in the traditional 3 champions' combat duel on the day of the Battle of Badr before the full battle began. Walid, his father Utba, and his uncle Shayba were the three champions of the Meccan army who fought a duel against Hamza ibn Abd al-Muttalib, Ali ibn Abi Talib, and Ubayda ibn al-Harith. In the combat duel, Walid was killed by Ali, Walid's father Utba was killed by Hamza, and then his uncle Shayba was killed by Ubayda.

See also
Sahaba
List of battles of Muhammad

Opponents of Muhammad
624 deaths
Year of birth unknown
People killed at the Battle of Badr
Banu Abd Shams